National Innovation Council may refer to:

National Innovation Council (India)
National Innovation Council (Philippines)